Premabhishekam is a 2008 Indian Telugulanguage comedy film directed by S. S. Vikram Gandhi, starring Venu Madhav, Priya Mohan and Ruthika along with Ali Basha, Brahmanandam, Nagababu, and Srihari.

Cast 
Venu Madhav as Nageshwar Rao
Priya Mohan as Sri Devi
Ruthika as Jayasudha
Ali Basha
Brahmanandam
Naga Babu
Srihari as Hari Bhai

References

External links
Listen Premabhishekam Songs
Premabhishekam News
Releasing News 
Film News

2008 films
2000s Telugu-language films